Michael Boyer (January, 1960) is an American actor who plays the role of the Pied Piper of Hamelin in performances in Hamelin, Germany.  He lives in the town with his wife and son.

Early years
Born in Harrisburg, Pennsylvania, Boyer sang in school choirs, acted, was school mascot, and emceed the school shows in his youth. The general poor finances of his family daunted his hopes of playing in the school band at the time, so that he never properly learned to play music. He was interested in learning the clarinet, but joined the US Army when he was 18. He opted for Germany and was stationed there for three years in the Military Police Corps. An additional seven years in the NATO civilian sector had him stationed in Comiso Italy, where he began to do radio spots for the troops.

The Piper
Upon returning to Germany, he organized events and wrote for army newspapers. The official position of the Pied Piper of Hamelin was vacant and Boyer, who had been playing a comical jester in the carnival season, put in for the position and was selected in 1994. He has played the role in local performances since then. His promotional tours have taken him as far as Tokyo, Shanghai, Helsinki, Vienna, and Nottingham. He appeared at the 50th Steuben Parade in New York City in 2007. At the 725th Anniversary of the tale "Pied Piper Day" he led the children to the mountain that historians tie to the tale. More information under "Talk"

References

External links
 Hamelin Germany city website in English
 Piper Legend
 
 at Getty Images
 at BBC
 "hollywood" DeWeZet
 Twenty-five years of memoirs in German

1960 births
Living people
Actors from Harrisburg, Pennsylvania
American expatriates in Germany
People from Harrisburg, Pennsylvania